The Nokia C3 Touch and Type, also known as the C3-01, is a mobile telephone handset produced by Nokia. It is the second mobile handset released by Nokia that possesses a touchscreen in a "candy bar" phone form factor that runs the Series 40 operating system. The C3-01 was announced on 15 September 2010. It has a stainless steel body (like Nokia 6700 classic), a 2.4" display, featuring a 5-megapixel camera with flash, Wi-Fi and 3G. 

There is also an hardware-upgraded version of the phone introduced on 23 July 2011, which can be identified from RM-776 and C3-01.5 codes in the sticker which can be found under the battery. The C3-01.5 (RM-776) differences compared to C3-01 (RM-640) are: 1GHz CPU vs 680 MHz CPU, 256 MB ROM vs 128 MB ROM and 128 MB RAM vs 64 MB RAM.

A luxury version of handset, known as C3-01 Gold Edition, was introduced on 23 August 2011. Technically and feature wise it is the same as C3-01.5

Features 
The phone has touchscreen and ITU-T (12 keys) keyboard but no navigation or soft keys. Other main features include: WLAN, HSPA, VoIP with HD Voice, a 5.0-megapixel camera with flash, WebKit open source browser, Flash Lite 3.0, Bluetooth 2.1 + EDR and MIDP Java 2.1 with additional Java APIs. This phone also supports the USB On-the-Go function, which enables the phone to act as a USB host.

Specification sheet

Issues 
As the phone has no softkeys, it is unable to support many applications.

References

External links
 Nokia C3-01 Product page
 Nokia C3-01 Device specification at Forum Nokia

Mobile phones introduced in 2010
C3 Touch and Type